Nikolaos "Nikos" Michalos (alternate spelling: Mihalos) (Greek: Νικόλαος "Νίκος" Μίχαλος; born May 21, 1977 in Maroussi, Athens, Greece) is a Greek former professional basketball player. At a height of 1.92 m (6'3 ") tall, he played at the point guard and shooting guard positions.

Professional career
In his pro career, Michalos played in the top-tier level Greek Basket League, with Peiraikos Syndesmos, 
Olympiacos, Panionios, Esperos Kallitheas, and Milon. While with Olympiacos, he played in the 1997 McDonald's Championship Final, against the Chicago Bulls. As a member of Panionios, he played in the European-wide 3rd-tier level FIBA Korać Cup, during the 1998–99 season.

Late in his career, he became the team captain of Panionios. He joined Ethnikos Piraeus in 2018.

National team career
Michalos was a member of the junior national teams of Greece. He played at the 1998 FIBA Europe Under-20 Championship.

Personal life
Michalos' father, Takis Michalos, was a Greek professional water polo player and coach.

References

External links
FIBA.com Profile
FIBA Europe Profile
Eurobasket.com Profile
Basketball-reference.com Profile
ProBallers.com Profile
AboveAverage.gr Profile
Greek Basket League Profile 
Greek Basket League Profile 

1977 births
Living people
AGEH Gymnastikos B.C. players
Aigaleo B.C. players
Doukas B.C. players
Esperos B.C. players
Ethnikos Piraeus B.C. players
Greek Basket League players
Greek men's basketball players
Milon B.C. players
Near East B.C. players
Olympiacos B.C. players
Pagrati B.C. players
Palaio Faliro B.C. players
Papagou B.C. players
Panionios B.C. players
Peiraikos Syndesmos B.C. players
Peramatos Ermis B.C. players
Point guards
Shooting guards
Basketball players from Athens